In the 1967 Mediterranean Games, one of the games played was volleyball. Yugoslavia won the men's division.

Medalists

Standings
Men's competition

References
1967 Mediterranean Games report at the International Committee of Mediterranean Games (CIJM) website
List of Olympians who won medals at the Mediterranean Games at Olympedia.org

Volleyball at the Mediterranean Games
1967 in volleyball
Sports at the 1967 Mediterranean Games